George S. Robinson is a North Carolina Republican politician who served in the North Carolina House of Representatives from 1980–86 and 1988-96 and was selected by Caldwell County party leaders in 2015 to return to the legislature to fill an unexpired term. Through the end of 2016, Robinson will fill the 87th District seat vacated by Edgar Starnes, who resigned to accept a position with the North Carolina State Treasurer's office. Robinson ran for a new full term but was defeated by Destin Hall in the March 15, 2016 Republican primary.

Robinson, a native of Lenoir, North Carolina, is a veteran of the United States Air Force and an alumnus of the University of Tennessee.

After Robinson served his first three terms, he gave up his seat to run for the United States House of Representatives, but was defeated by Cass Ballenger in a Republican primary election. Robinson then served as deputy assistant secretary of the North Carolina Department of Transportation under Governor James G. Martin. He returned to the legislature in the 1988 election and was re-elected in 1990, 1992 and 1994. Concerns about his family’s timber company’s financial situation made him decide not to run for re-election in 1996. In 1997, he became mayor of the village of Cedar Rock, North Carolina.

Robinson was also an unsuccessful candidate for the North Carolina Senate in 2004 (losing to Jim Jacumin in a Republican primary election) and in 2012 (losing to Dan Soucek in a Republican primary election).

Recent electoral history

2016

2012

2004

References

External links
Ballotpedia

|-

|-

|-

|-

1945 births
Living people
21st-century American politicians
Republican Party members of the North Carolina House of Representatives
People from Lenoir, North Carolina